The Off Cut Festival is a showcase for new and undiscovered playwriting, directing and acting talent, with an emphasis on keeping the audience at the heart of the theatre experience.

It was created in 2009 by Trudi Boatwright and Daniel Brennan (artistic directors of In Company Theatre), with the first festival being held at The Old Red Lion Theatre in Angel, London. Twenty-eight short plays (24 in 2009 and 2010) run in four groups, with audience members voting for their favourite plays. The two plays in each group with the most votes go through to a final week, where the audience continues to vote until an ultimate winner is found. A panel of industry professionals attend the final night handing out awards for Writing, Directing and Ensemble Acting.

Off Cut 2009 

The first festival was held at The Old Red Lion Theatre in Angel, London from 29 September to 18 October. The panel was headed by Moira Buffini, and included playwrights Josephine Melville and Robert Rigby, directors Psyche Stott and Nigel Douglas, producer Andrew Robb; literary agent Anna Brewer; playwright and actor Andrew Neil and Old Red Lion Artistic directors, Helen and Damien Devine.

One hundred and ninety-six plays were submitted from all over the world.

Group One

Group Two

Group Three

Group Four

Off Cut 2010 

After the unprecedented success of the first festival, it was quickly decided by all parties that a second event would run at the same venue from 21 September to 10 October. The same panel (though this time without Andrew Neil) was joined by actor Patricia Hodge, literary agent Lisa Babalis and playwright Tena Štivičić.

The Artistic Directors were joined by Nick Kneller as Producer.

This was the only year that the Off Cut producers selected a 'wild card' entry for the finals.

All actors would now be cast in collaboration with the Off Cut company, as opposed to writers and/or directors finding their own.

Four hundred and thirty-six plays were received, with writers from around the world able to submit up to four plays.

Group One

Group Two

Group Three

Group Four

Off Cut 2011 

After another enormously successful run, it was decided that the festival needed to move to a bigger venue. The Riverside Studios - Studio Three would be Off Cut's new home and the festival ran from 27 September to 16 October. The panel, still headed by Moira Buffini, included casting director Jo Buckingham and Rob Drummer of HighTide.

A record 722 plays were submitted for consideration.

As in previous years, 24 plays were chosen by Off Cut's reading panel. A further eight were put to a panel of theatre bloggers, who chose four to go through to the festival. The bloggers were Scott Matthewman, Ian Foster of Ought to be Clowns, video blogger Alison Child, Luke Murphy of Twespians and Havana Wellings-Longmore of Talawa Theatre Company.

To further advocate the spirit of collaboration, from this year no writer was allowed to direct their own work.

Trudi Boatwright moved back to Australia, where she is still involved in Off Cut and runs a pared-down version in Melbourne.

In Company Theatre was closed down and The Off Cut Festival became a company in its own right.

Group One

Group Two

Group Three

Group Four

Off Cut 2012 

The festival remained at Riverside for 2012, moving into the much larger Studio Two. It ran from 25 September until 13 October. The panel was again headed by Moira Buffini, and included actor (and former Off Cut participant), Julia St. John and Matthew Poxon of The National Theatre Studio.

The number of plays writers were allowed to submit was reduced from four to two, and only UK-based playwrights were eligible or consideration. Nevertheless, 396 plays were received.

The Bloggers' Choice panel was made up of Ian Foster, Alison Child and Scott Matthewman.

This year, audience members were also able to vote online for their favourite actors (male and female), playwright and director.

Group One

Group Two

Group Three

Group Four

Off Cut 2013 

Giving time for further development and restructuring of the festival, it was decided to scale down production for 2013. Therefore, a much smaller project was devised in conjunction with Theatre 503 in Battersea. Writers were asked to submit plays between 30 and 45 minutes in length, with a view to their working closely with actors and directors, as well as with 503 dramaturg, Graeme Thompson and Off Cut's Artistic Director, Daniel Brennan to develop their plays in rehearsal. Two plays were chosen to run in a double-bill at Theatre 503 from 12 to 17 August.

No prizes were awarded, either by an panel or the audience.

Off Cut Roots

References

 http://www.offwestend.com/index.php/news/view/143
 http://www.remotegoat.com/uk/review_view.php?uid=6040
 http://www.thepublicreviews.com/the-off-cut-festival-riverside-studios-hammersmith/
 http://oughttobeclowns.blogspot.co.uk/2011/10/review-off-cut-festival-group-3.html
 http://onestoparts.com/review-off-cut-festival-2012
 http://www.sugaredeggs.com/playwright/two-rings-at-the-off-cut-festival
 http://www.whatsonstage.com/off-west-end-theatre/reviews/10-2009/off-cut-festival_15536.html
 http://www.fringereview.co.uk/fringeReview/3192.html
 http://www.michaelrossplaywright.com/?cat=3
 http://www.newlandfilms.co.uk/looking-for-vi-2014.html

Festivals in London